3 Legends Stadium is a baseball stadium in Butte, Montana. The ballpark opened in 2017 hosting American Legion baseball and in 2021 welcomed the Mining City Tommyknockers of the summer-collegiate Expedition League. Located at the Copper Mountain Sports Complex, the stadium name honors three long-time supporters of American Legion baseball in Butte. The ballpark's playing field is named Miners Field.

Stadium upgrade plans were announced in October 2020 to "enhance the fan experience." Seating capacity would increase from 470 to 1,300. The planned additional seating and amenities were to include bleachers, a V.I.P. seating area, a 200-300 person party deck in left field, a hot tub section in centerfield, and a children's play area with a zip-line. In April 2021, the county commissioners rejected the hot tub idea due to liability concerns.

References

2017 establishments in Montana
Baseball venues in Montana
Buildings and structures in Butte, Montana
Sports venues completed in 2017
Tourist attractions in Butte, Montana